Robert N Anderson (December 25, 1843 – June 20, 1900) was a Union Navy sailor in the American Civil War and a recipient of the United States military's highest decoration, the Medal of Honor.

Biography
During the First Battle of Charleston Harbor on April 7, 1863, Robert Anderson was at the wheel of the Keokuk as it took heavy fire from the Confederates. When a shell hit the wheelhouse, Bobby used his body to shield his commanding officer from flying debris. For his service aboard the Crusader and Keokuk, and specifically his actions at Charleston Harbor, Bobby was awarded the Medal of Honor on July 10, 1863.

Robert Anderson died at age 56 and was buried at Calvary Cemetery in Portsmouth, New Hampshire.

Medal of Honor citation
Anderson's official Medal of Honor citation reads:
Served on board the U.S.S. Crusader and the Keokuk during various actions of those vessels. Carrying out his duties skillfully while on board the U.S.S. Crusader, Q.M.Robert Anderson, on all occasions, set forth the greatest intrepidity and devotion. During the attack on Charleston, while serving on board the U.S.S. Keokuk, Q.M. Robert Anderson was stationed at the wheel when shot penetrated the house and, with the scattering of the iron, used his own body as a shield for his commanding officer.

See also

List of Medal of Honor recipients
List of American Civil War Medal of Honor recipients: A–F

References

1843 births
1900 deaths
Irish emigrants to the United States (before 1923)
Union Navy sailors
United States Navy Medal of Honor recipients
Irish-born Medal of Honor recipients
American Civil War recipients of the Medal of Honor